Mason-Dixon Roller Vixens (MDRV) is a women's flat track roller derby league based in Hagerstown, Maryland, and a member of the Women's Flat Track Derby Association (WFTDA). Founded in 2007, it consists of two teams: the WFTDA-ranked travel team, the All-Stars, and its B-team, the Cannon Brawlers.

History
Mason-Dixon Roller Vixens was established in June 2007, and initially practiced in Greencastle, Pennsylvania.  It started with eight skaters, and increased to twenty by mid-2009.  Several of them broke off to form Key City Roller Derby, a league in Frederick, Maryland. Key City Roller Derby dissolved in 2016 and several of its remaining members joined MDRV.

Mason-Dixon was accepted into the Women's Flat Track Derby Association Apprentice Program in April 2010, and became a full member in March 2012.

WFTDA rankings

References

Hagerstown, Maryland
Roller derby leagues established in 2007
Roller derby leagues in Maryland
Women's Flat Track Derby Association Division 3
2007 establishments in Maryland